Euura pustulator is a species of sawfly belonging to the family Tenthredinidae (common sawflies). The larvae feed internally in a gall formed on the leaves of tea-leaved willow (Salix phylicifolia) and diamondleaf willow (Salix pulchra).

Description of the gall
The thin-walled gall is ovoid, bladder-like, usually green and may broaden the leaf. It is 11 mm long and 5 mm across and is found on tea-leaved willow (S. phylicifolia) and diamondleaf willow (S. pulchra).

Euura pustulator is one of two closely related species in the Euura vesicator subgroup; the other being E. vesicator.

Distribution
The sawfly has been recorded from Finland, Great Britain (northern England and Scotland), Russia, Slovakia and Sweden.

References

Tenthredinidae
Gall-inducing insects
Hymenoptera of Europe
Insects described in 1923
Willow galls